Kölsch may refer to:
Kölsch (beer), a style of beer from Cologne, Germany
Kölsch (artist), house musician/DJ
Kölsch (dialect) or Colognian language, a Ripuarian dialect spoken in and around Cologne
USS Koelsch, a vessel of the Garcia class of the US Navy

People with the surname
C. Frederick Koelsch (1907-1999), American chemist
John Kelvin Koelsch (1923–1951), United States Navy officer
Rune Reilly Kölsch or Rune RK, Danish producer and songwriter

See also
SK Kölsch, a German television series
Tierisch Kölsch, a German television series